Jeholosauridae was a group of herbivorous neornithischian dinosaurs from the Cretaceous Period (Aptian - Cenomanian). The family was first proposed by Han et al. in 2012. The jeholosaurids were defined as all neornithischians more closely related to Jeholosaurus shangyuanensis than to Hypsilophodon foxii, Iguanodon bernissartensis, Protoceratops andrewsi, Pachycephalosaurus wyomingensis, or Thescelosaurus neglectus. The Jeholosauridae includes the type genus Jeholosaurus, and also possibly Yueosaurus, Changchunsaurus, and Haya.

The cladogram below results from analysis by Herne et al., 2019, which added Changchunsaurus and Haya  to Jeholosauridae, but moved Yueosaurus to the sister family Thescelosauridae.

References

Cretaceous dinosaurs
Ornithischians
Prehistoric dinosaur families